Bungie is an American video game developer located in Bellevue, Washington. The company was established in May 1991 by University of Chicago undergraduate student Alex Seropian, who later brought in programmer Jason Jones after publishing Jones's game Minotaur: The Labyrinths of Crete. Originally based in Chicago, Illinois, the company concentrated primarily on Macintosh games during its early years, creating the successful games Pathways Into Darkness and the Marathon and Myth series. A West Coast satellite studio named Bungie West produced the PC and console title Oni in 2001. Microsoft acquired Bungie in 2000; its then-current project was repurposed into a launch title for Microsoft's new Xbox console, called Halo: Combat Evolved. Halo went on to become the Xbox's "killer application", selling millions of copies and spawning a billion dollar franchise. On October 5, 2007, Bungie announced that it had split from Microsoft and became a privately held independent company, Bungie LLC. The company later incorporated and signed a ten-year publishing deal with Activision Blizzard. The company is known for its informal and dedicated workplace culture, and has recently released new titles with Activision, including IP Destiny.

Games

References 

Bungie
Halo (franchise)
Video game lists by company